Ctenolophon is the only genus in the flowering plant  family Ctenolophonaceae. It has two recognized species:

 Ctenolophon englerianus Mildbr. - central Africa (Nigeria, Gabon, Zaire, Angola)
 Ctenolophon parvifolius Oliv. - New Guinea and southeast Asia (Thailand, Malaysia, Borneo, Sumatra, Philippines)

References

Malpighiales genera
Malpighiales
Taxa named by Daniel Oliver